Juliano Fernando Gento Máquina (born 18 August 1993 in Maputo) is a Mozambican boxer. He competed in the Men's light flyweight event at the 2012 Summer Olympics but lost in the first round to Aleksandar Aleksandrov.

References

External links
 

1993 births
Living people
Sportspeople from Maputo
Mozambican male boxers
Boxers at the 2012 Summer Olympics
Olympic boxers of Mozambique
Competitors at the 2019 African Games
Light-flyweight boxers
African Games competitors for Mozambique